Cristina del Carmen Ferral Montalván (born 16 February 1993), known as Cristina Ferral, is a Mexican footballer who plays as a midfielder for Tigres UANL and the Mexico women's national team.

Honours and achievements

Club
UANL
Liga MX Femenil: Clausura 2018
Liga MX Femenil: Clausura 2019

International career
Ferral represented Mexico at the 2010 CONCACAF Women's U-17 Championship, the 2010 FIFA U-17 Women's World Cup and the 2012 CONCACAF Women's U-20 Championship. She made her senior international debut on 8 July 2017.

International goals

References

External links
 
 
 
 2016 Stats in the Mexican women's college football championship website 
 Cristina Ferral's stats at StatsFootFeminin.fr 

1993 births
Living people
Mexican women's footballers
Footballers from Tamaulipas
People from Tampico, Tamaulipas
Women's association football midfielders
Mexico women's international footballers
Universiade silver medalists for Mexico
Universiade medalists in football
South Florida Bulls women's soccer players
Monterrey Institute of Technology and Higher Education alumni
Division 1 Féminine players
Olympique de Marseille (women) players
Liga MX Femenil players
Tigres UANL (women) footballers
Mexican expatriate women's footballers
Mexican expatriate sportspeople in the United States
Expatriate women's soccer players in the United States
Mexican expatriate sportspeople in France
Expatriate women's footballers in France
Medalists at the 2013 Summer Universiade
Mexican footballers